is a train station in Jōyō, Kyoto Prefecture, Japan, operated by West Japan Railway Company (JR West). It has the station number "JR-D12".

Lines
Jōyō Station is served by the Nara Line.

Layout 
The station consists of two side platforms serving one track each. The IC card ticket "ICOCA" can be used at this station.

Platforms

History
Station numbering was introduced in March 2018 with Jōyō being assigned station number JR-D12.

Passenger statistics
According to the Kyoto Prefecture statistical report, the average number of passengers per day is as follows.

Adjacent stations

References

External links

  

Railway stations in Kyoto Prefecture